is a railway station in Naka-ku, Hamamatsu,  Shizuoka Prefecture, Japan, operated by the private railway company, Enshū Railway.

Lines
Jidōshagakkō Mae Station is a station on the  Enshū Railway Line and is 5.3 kilometers from the starting point of the line at Shin-Hamamatsu Station.

Station layout
The station is an unattended station with a single ground-level island platform. The station building is a four-story building, with the upper floors as private condominiums. The station building has automated ticket machines, and automated turnstiles which accept the NicePass smart card, as well as ET Card, a magnetic card ticketing system.

Platforms

Adjacent stations

|-
!colspan=5|Enshū Railway

Station History
The station gained its present name with the opening of a large driver's training school nearby in 1966. The station has been unmanned since September 1974.

Passenger statistics
In fiscal 2017, the station was used by an average of 971  passengers daily (boarding passengers only).

Surrounding area
Entetsu Driving School

See also
 List of railway stations in Japan

References

External links

 Enshū Railway official website

Railway stations in Japan opened in 1909
Railway stations in Shizuoka Prefecture
Railway stations in Hamamatsu
Stations of Enshū Railway